Barykino is a rural locality (a village) in Ilyinskoye Rural Settlement, Kolchuginsky District, Vladimir Oblast, Russia. The population was 1 as of 2010.

Geography 
The village is located 10 km east from Bolshevik, 14 km north-east from Kolchugino.

References 

Rural localities in Kolchuginsky District